Viktor Semyonovich Semyonov (born 28 June 1949) is a Soviet racewalker. He competed in the men's 20 kilometres walk at the 1976 Summer Olympics.

References

1949 births
Living people
Athletes (track and field) at the 1976 Summer Olympics
Soviet male racewalkers
Olympic athletes of the Soviet Union
Place of birth missing (living people)